U.S. Route 395 Alternate (US 395 Alt) is a  alternate route of U.S. Route 395 (US 395) in Washoe County, Nevada.

Route description

Bowers Mansion Road

The route begins at the intersection of Eastlake Boulevard and Bowers Mansion Road/Old US 395 near Franktown just north of Carson City. The highway winds along the mountains on the west side of Washoe Valley as it meanders northward. The highway passes the historic Bowers Mansion state park before intersecting Interstate 580 (I-580) and US 395 near Winters Ranch.

Carson–Reno Highway
After passing over the interstate, US 395 Alt. becomes the four-lane Carson–Reno Highway. The second junction with Eastlake Boulevard (former SR 428) at the top of this hill is dubbed the "Washoe Hill Memorial" and is dedicated to victims of drunk driving. As the road descends, it curves north once again to enter Pleasant Valley. The route crosses over Steamboat Creek and Jones Creek as it passes through the rural community.

After leaving Pleasant Valley, US 395 Alt. curves east and north again to travel through Steamboat Hills. Development of this small community dates back to 1859, when a small resort was established that took advantage of the natural hot springs nearby. Steamboat's springs are still active today, producing geothermal power for northwest Nevada since 1991.

The highway meets the Mount Rose Junction just north of Steamboat. This junction provides access to Mount Rose and North Lake Tahoe via Mount Rose Highway (State Route 431), as well as Virginia City to the southeast by Geiger Grade (State Route 341).

South Virginia Street
Passing the Mount Rose Junction, US 395 Alt. enters the Reno city limits and becomes South Virginia Street. The route continues north to intersect a half-interchange with I-580 and US 395 north. Passing under the freeway, the U.S. Route 395 Business designation begins. The roadway turns slightly more westward as it travels further north into Reno. In about three miles (5 km), the highway again meets the I-580 / US 395 freeway. US 395 Alt reaches its northern terminus just north of there, at the intersection of South Virginia Street and Patriot Boulevard; U.S. 395 Business, however continues to follow Virginia Street northward towards downtown Reno.

History
All of this route previously served as the main alignment of US 395 at some point, with mainline US 395 being rerouted as bypassing freeway segments were constructed. With the completion of I-580 between Mount Rose Junction and Washoe City, the US 395 Alt designation was created to serve as a high-profile vehicle detour during high wind conditions on the interstate.

Prior to the establishment of US 395 Alt. in 2012, the Bowers Mansion Road section of the highway was previously designated State Route 429 while the Carson–Reno Highway and Virginia Street sections were part of State Route 430. Both state routes were removed from these highways in favor of the alternate route.

Major intersections

See also

References

External links

Nevada @ AARoads - Alternate U.S. Highway 395 North - Washoe Lake to Reno

95-3 Alternate
95-3 Alternate (Nevada)
Alternate
Transportation in Washoe County, Nevada
Transportation in Reno, Nevada